Count Philippe de Lannoy (14 August 1922 – 10 January 2019) was a Belgian noble and provincial councillor of Hainaut. He was the alderman of finance for Frasnes-lez-Anvaing. He was the father of Stéphanie, Hereditary Grand Duchess of Luxembourg. His full name was Philippe Marie Ernest Albert; his title in French was comte de Lannoy et du Saint-Empire.

Early life 
Philippe was born as the eldest child of Count Paul Charles de Lannoy (1898-1980) and his wife, Princess Marie Béatrix of Ligne (1898-1982), daughter of Ernest, 10th Prince of Ligne (1857-1937) and Diane de Cossé-Brissac (1869-1950).

Personal life 
He married his wife, the late Countess Alix de Lannoy, in 1965. Countess Alix de Lannoy, born Alix della Faille de Leverghem, died on 27 August 2012 at the age of 70.

Count and Countess Philippe de Lannoy had eight children, one of whom, Stéphanie, married Guillaume, Hereditary Grand Duke of Luxembourg.

Death and legacy
He died on 10 January 2019 at the age of 96. The funeral, attended by Queen Matilde, took place at the Church of Saint-Amand in Frasnes-lez-Anvaing. He is remembered fondly and with gratitude as having been a volunteer for the First Belgian Field Regiment during World War II.

Honours and decorations
  Volunteer's Medal 1940–1945 (1946).
  Officer of the Order of Leopold II.
  Knight of the Order of Leopold.
  Grand Decoration of Honour for Services to the Republic of Austria.
  Knight Grand Cross Jure Sanguinis of the Sacred Military Constantinian Order of Saint George (1982).

References

1922 births
2019 deaths
Counts of Belgium
Officers of the Order of Leopold II
Belgian Roman Catholics
Belgian military personnel of World War II
Ph